Leones Vegetarianos Fútbol Club is an Equatoguinean football club based in the city of Malabo. It currently plays in Equatoguinean first division. The club was founded as Vegetarianos CF by the Spaniard Juan Manuel Rojas, a vegetarian man from Granada who arrived in Equatorial Guinea in 2001 and years later went to India, where he staged a hunger strike. Its rival club is Atlético Semu.

Notable players

Achievements
Equatoguinean Premier League: 2
2017, 2018.

Equatoguinean Cup: 1
2014.

Equatoguinean Super Cup: 0

Performance in CAF competitions 

 CAF Champions League: 2 appearances
2018 - Preliminary Round
2019 - Preliminary Round

 CAF Confederation Cup: 1 appearance
2015 - Preliminary Round

References

External links
 
 

 
Association football clubs established in 2000
2000 establishments in Equatorial Guinea
Sport in Malabo